K-word may refer to:

Kaffir (racial term), a racial slur used in South Africa
KWord, a deprecated word processor and desktop publishing application
KWRD-FM, a Christian radio station in Texas
Keling, a racial slur to denote a person originating from the Indian subcontinent, including overseas Indians

See also
Kike, an anti-Semitic slur
Karen (slang), a slang term aimed towards impolite and sometimes racist women
Kurwa, a profanity in Polish